The Accademia Filarmonica Romana is a musical institution based in Rome, Italy. It was established in 1821 by a group of upper class amateur musicians led by the Marquis Raffaele Muti Papazzurri (1801–1858) in order to encourage the performance of chamber music and symphony, and to perform in concert operas whose representation was hampered by censorship. 

In 1824  it became an official institution of the Papal States with the aim of "training students to the exercise of the vocal and instrumental music."

The Academy suspended its activities between 1849 and 1856 for economic difficulties, and in 1860 it was disbanded by the papal government, as many of its members were accused of having liberal ideas. It resumed its activities in 1870. Gaetano Donizetti collaborated with the institution by composing a part of a cantata which was commissioned by the Academy, Il genio dell'Armonia in omaggio a Pio VIII, and conducting Anna Bolena in 1833.

References

https://g.co/kgs/vHf3wn

External links
Official site

Musical groups established in the 1820s
1821 establishments in Italy
Culture in Rome
Italian orchestras